Trichodesma is a genus of death-watch beetles in the family Ptinidae. There are about 11 described species in Trichodesma.

Species
These 11 species belong to the genus Trichodesma:
 Trichodesma cristata (Casey, 1890) i c g b
 Trichodesma fuliginosa White, 1981 i c g
 Trichodesma gibbosa (Say, 1825) i c g b
 Trichodesma klagesi Fall, 1905 i c g b
 Trichodesma kurosawai Sakai, 1986 g
 Trichodesma pratti Fisher, 1919 i c g
 Trichodesma pulchella Schaeffer, 1903 i c g b
 Trichodesma sellata Horn, 1894 i c g
 Trichodesma setifera (LeConte, 1858) i c g
 Trichodesma sordida Horn, 1894 i c g b
 Trichodesma texana Schaeffer, 1903 i c g b
Data sources: i = ITIS, c = Catalogue of Life, g = GBIF, b = Bugguide.net

References

Further reading

External links

 

Anobiinae